Menedemus was a Greek philosopher and founder of the Eretrian school.

Menedemus may also refer to:

 Menedemus (general), one of the generals of Alexander the Great
 Menedemus of Pyrrha, a member of Plato's Academy
 Menedemus the Cynic, a Cynic philosopher
 Menedemus (insect), a genus of shield bugs in the tribe Sciocorini